Clichê Adolescente is the second studio album by Brazilian singer-songwriter Manu Gavassi. It was released on August 30, 2013 on iTunes and on November 29, 2013 in physical stores through Midas Music. The album was produced by Rick Bonadio, same producer of her debut album.

Track listing

References 

Albums produced by Rick Bonadio
Brazilian music